The 1965 Ice Hockey World Championships took place in Hakametsä, Tampere, Finland, 3–15 March. Eight teams took part, each playing each other once. The Soviets became world champions for the fifth time, winning all of their games.  This also counted as their ninth European title, with the Czechs finishing second and the Swedes third.  For the third straight year Canada finished fourth.  The tournament employed new tie-breaking rules, which some believed were supposed to be in place for the Innsbruck Olympics.  To decide medals priority would be given to the team who won the head-to-head game, unless they tied, or more than two teams were tied.  In those two cases goal differential would be used, but only the goal differential between the top four teams.

Fifteen nations played in two groups, with qualification games used to establish the tier for closely ranked teams.  From now on, the last place team in group 'A' would be relegated, with the group 'B' champion being promoted to replace them.  Poland went undefeated to earn promotion, defeating the Swiss, and tying the West Germans.

The event was the first Ice Hockey World Championships hosted by Finland, and was organized by Harry Lindblad, president of the Finnish Ice Hockey Association.

Qualifying round Group A

First round

Second round

World Championship Group A (Tampere, Finland)

Norway was relegated to 1966 Group B.

Qualifying round Group B

World Championship Group B (Turku, Rauma, and Pori, Finland)

Poland earned promotion to the 1966 Group A.  Romania joined France and Italy in the following year's qualification for Group B.

Ranking and statistics

Tournament Awards
Best players selected by the directorate:
Best Goaltender:       Vladimír Dzurilla
Best Defenceman:       František Tikal
Best Forward:          Vyacheslav Starshinov
Media All-Star Team:
Goaltender:  Vladimír Dzurilla
Defence:  Alexander Ragulin,  František Tikal
Forwards:  Alexander Almetov,  Jaroslav Jiřík,  Konstantin Loktev

Final standings
The final standings of the tournament according to IIHF:

European championships final standings
The final standings of the European championships according to IIHF:

Citations

References

Summary (in french)

IIHF Men's World Ice Hockey Championships
World Championships
1965
March 1965 sports events in Europe
Sports competitions in Tampere
International sports competitions in Turku
1960s in Turku
Rauma, Finland
Sport in Pori